Veronika Vlasova (born 2 November 1966, Kemerovo) is a Russian political figure and a deputy of the 8th State Duma.
 
From 1990 to 2021, Vlasova worked at the Kemerovo Regional Clinical Hospital, first as an intern doctor and, later, as obstetrician-gynaecologist of the gynaecological department. In November 2003, she was appointed head of the gynaecological department. In September - October 2012, she had an internship in the Netherlands as part of the Presidential Management Training Program. Since September 2021, she has served as deputy of the 8th State Duma.

References
 

 

1966 births
Living people
United Russia politicians
21st-century Russian politicians
21st-century Russian women politicians
Eighth convocation members of the State Duma (Russian Federation)